The Kerala women's cricket team is a domestic cricket team based in the Indian state of Kerala. The team has represented the state in Women's Senior One Day Trophy and  Senior women's T20 league.

Playing history
Kerala was one of the 24 teams that competed in the inaugural season of Women's Senior One Day Trophy.  It competed in the South Zone, against Tamil Nadu, Karnataka, Andhra, Hyderabad and Goa.

Current squad
Players with international caps are listed in bold.

References

Women's cricket teams in India
Women in Kerala
Cricket in Kerala